Count Johann Philipp of Hanau-Lichtenberg ( in Bouxwiller – 18 December 1669 in Babenhausen) was a son of Count Philipp Wolfgang (1595–1641) and his wife, Countess Johanna of Oettingen-Oettingen (1602–1639).

During his childhood, his parents had to flee several times from their county seat in Bouxwiller to nearby Strasbourg, where the family possessed a mansion, to avoid the fighting of the Thirty Years' War.  As the second son, he was assigned the castle and district of Babenhausen in his father's testament.  He could only take possession of Babenhausen in 1647, as it had been occupied by Mainz during the war.  After the war ended, Johann Philipp and his younger brother Johann Reinhard (1628–1666) went on a Grand Tour to Germany, the Netherlands, England, France and Switzerland.

In 1664 Johann Philipp visited the Diet of Regensburg, where he got into a duel against a prince of House of Reuss.  In 1669 he tried to stage a coup against his brother Friedrich Casimir who had burdened the county of Hanau with heavy debts and was trying to improve his financial situation by selling a part of his territory.  Friedrich Casimir's relatives disagreed and in November 1669, they seized power during his absence.  Their emergency government collapsed after three days and Friedrich Casimir was restored to power.  Friedrich Casimir then exiled Johann Philipp from the city of Hanau.

Johann Philipp died the next month, on 18 December 1669 and was buried in the St. Nikolaus church in Babenhausen, where his wife had been buried earlier.

Marriage and issue 
On 16 February 1651, he married Princess Susanna Margarete of Anhalt-Dessau (1610–1663).  She was a daughter of Johann Georg I, Prince of Anhalt-Dessau (1567–1618) and Countess Palatine Dorothea of Simmern. She was a younger sister of Princess Sibylle Christine of Anhalt-Dessau (1603–1686), the second wife of Friedrich Casimir, who was the reigning count and an older brother of Johann Philipp.  The marriage remained childless.

Johann Philipp had several illegitimate children.  At least three are documented:
 A daughter (b. after 1663), married to a customs official name Cressl
 A son (b. after 1663), who used the family name of Berg and served as an officer in the militia of Hanau
 Another son (b. after 1663), who also used the family name of Berg and also served as an officer in the militia of Hanau
Nothing is known about the mother of these children.

Ancestors

References
 Georg Friedrich Dhein: Sammlungen zur Hanauer Geschichte, 7 vols, unpublished, type-written manuscript in the City Library in Hanau, section Hanau-Hesse, signature I b 2 D
 Reinhard Dietrich: Die Landesverfassung in dem Hanauischen, in the series Hanauer Geschichtsblätter, vol. 34, Hanau, 1996, 
 Katalog der Leichenpredigten und sonstigen Trauerschriften im Hessischen Staatsarchiv Darmstadt, in the series Marburger Personalschriftenforschungen, vol. 14, Sigmaringen, 1992
 Wilhelm Morhardt: Hanau alt's - in Ehren b'halt's - Die Grafen von Hanau-Lichtenberg in Geschichte und Geschichten, in the series Babenhausen einst und jetzt, vol. 10, Babenhausen, 1984
 Reinhard Suchier: Genealogie des Hanauer Grafenhauses, in: Festschrift des Hanauer Geschichtsvereins zu seiner fünfzigjährigen Jubelfeier am 27. August 1894, Hanau, 1894
 Richard Wille: Hanau im dreissigjährigen Kriege, Hanau, 1886
 Ernst J. Zimmermann: Hanau Stadt und Land, 3rd ed., Hanau, 1919, reprinted 1978

Footnotes 

Counts of Hanau-Lichtenberg
1626 births
1669 deaths
17th-century German people